Iran national under-23 football team, also known as Iran U-23 or Iran Olympic Team; represents Iran in international football competitions in Olympic Games, Asian Games and AFC U-22 Asian Cup, as well as any other under-23 international football tournaments. It is controlled by the Iran Football Federation.

History
The winner of the gold medal at the 2002 Asian Games, the team was prepared to defend its championship title at the football tournament of the 2006 Asian Games in Doha, Qatar. Despite a suspension by FIFA, preventing Iran to enter any international football competition, the Iran under-23 team was given special permission to participate in the Asian Games, where they won the bronze medal.

Wild cards 
Football at the Asian Games has required that under-23 players enter the competitions, but they have allowed three over-age players can be included in the squad. Iran used three players, known as the "Wild cards", in three versions of the games in 2002, 2006 and 2010:

Results and fixtures

Legend

2021

2022

Coaching staff

Current coaching staff

Manager history

  Hassan Habibi (1991–1994)
  Enver Hadžiabdić (1994)
  Hans-Jürgen Gede (1994–1995)
  Hassan Habibi (1995)
  Ebrahim Ghasempour (1997–1999)
  Egon Coordes (1999)
  Mehdi Monajati (1999–2002)
  Branko Ivanković (2002–2003)
  Mohammad Mayeli Kohan (2003–2004)
  Renê Simões (2005–2006)
  Vinko Begović (2006–2007)
  Nenad Nikolić (2007–2008)
  Gholam Hossein Peyrovani (2009–2010)
  Human Afazeli (2010–2011)
  Ali Reza Mansourian (2011–2014)
  Human Afazeli (2014)
  Nelo Vingada (2014)
  Mohammad Khakpour (2014–2016)
  Amir Hossein Peiravani (2017)
  Zlatko Kranjčar (2018–2019)
  Farhad Majidi (2019)
  Hamid Estili (2019–2021)
  Mehdi Mahdavikia (2021–2022)

Players

Current squad
The following players were selected to compete in the Football at the 2021 Islamic Solidarity Games.

Recent call-ups
The following players have been called up for a team in the last 12 months.

Previous squads
AFC U-23 Asian Cup
AFC U-23 Championship 2013 squad
AFC U-23 Championship 2016 squad
AFC U-23 Championship 2020 squad

Honours

Continental
Asian Games†
 Gold Medal (1): 2002
 Bronze Medal (1): 2006
4th place (1): 2010
†U-23 teams were favoured by AFC and the IOC since 2002 Asian Games.The Senior team competed in the games before 2002.

Regional
WAFF U-23 Championship
 Winners (1): 2015
West Asian Games
 Champions (1): 1997.
 Runners-up (1): 2002.
 3rd place (1): 2005.

Other
 Semi-finalists in  1999 Dunhill Cup
1st place in  2006 VTV-T&T Cup (Spring Cup)
3rd place in  2008 Turkmenistan President's Cup
1st place in  2010 Velayat Cup
2nd place in  2010 Ho Chi Minh City Cup
1st place in  2013 International Friendship Youth Tournament
1st place in  Antalya Tournament

Competitive record

Olympic Games

AFC U-23 Asian Cup

''*Denotes draws which include knockout matches decided on penalty kicks.

Asian Games

WAFF U-23 Championship

West Asian Games

Islamic Solidarity Games

See also
Sport in Iran
Football in Iran
Women's football in Iran
Iran national football team
Iran national under-20 football team
Iran national under-17 football team
Iran national futsal team
Iran national under-20 futsal team
Iran national beach soccer team
Iran women's national football team

References

External links
Official Website of IR Iran Football Federation at archive.org
Official Website of IR Iran Football Federation 
https://web.archive.org/web/20101224031211/http://www.football3.ir/

Asian national under-23 association football teams
Under-23